Carl Emil Lindquist (May 9, 1919 – September 3, 2001) was a pitcher in Major League Baseball. He played for the Boston Braves.

References

External links

1919 births
2001 deaths
Major League Baseball pitchers
Boston Braves players
Baseball players from Pennsylvania
Mansfield Mounties baseball players
Valdosta Trojans players